The following is a list of transfers for the 2016 Major League Soccer season that have been made during the 2015–16 MLS offseason all the way through to the roster freeze on September 1, 2016.

The 2015–16 offseason is the first in the history of MLS in which free agency is allowed for qualified veteran players. Justin Mapp became the first MLS free-agent transfer on December 14, 2015, when he signed with Sporting Kansas City.

Transfers

 Player officially joined his new club on January 1, 2016.
 Only rights to player were acquired.
 Player will officially join his new club on July 4, 2016.

References

External links
 Official Site of Major League Soccer

2016

Major League
Major League